The Sultan Azlan Shah Polytechnic  (PSAS; formerly known as Polytechnic of Tanjong Malim or PTM) is a polytechnic institute in Behrang, Perak, Malaysia. It was established by the Ministry of Education on March 1, 2002 as the 15th polytechnic in the country.

History
PTM was envisioned to fulfill the government's effort in producing graduates for the needs of public and private sectors. On April 10, 2003, PTM shifted to its own campus. PTM was inaugurated on May 7, 2005 by Paduka Seri Sultan of Perak and was given a new name, the Polytechnic of Sultan Azlan Shah.

Courses offered

Bachelor of Manufacturing Engineering Technology (Automotive Design)
Diploma in Mechanical Engineering 
Diploma in Mechanical Engineering (Automotive)
Diploma in Mechanical Engineering (Manufacturing)
Diploma in Mechatronic Engineering 
Diploma in Civil Engineering 
Diploma in Electrical engineering 
Diploma in Electronic engineering 
Diploma in Electronic engineering (Computer) 
Diploma in Accounting 
Diploma in Marketing 
Diploma in Retailing
Diploma in Business Studies

References

Universities and colleges in Perak
Engineering universities and colleges in Malaysia
Technical universities and colleges in Malaysia
Educational institutions established in 2002
2002 establishments in Malaysia
Polytechnics in Malaysia